The Royal Naval School of Meteorology and Oceanography was a Royal Navy military meteorology training establishment in Cornwall; the site closed, and moved to Devon in 2003.

History
The meteorological training site began at Dale, Pembrokeshire, moving to Cornwall in 1959 for sailors, with officers arriving in 1960 at the RN School of Meteorology.

Also at the site in Wales was the RN Air Direction Centre, which trained officers and sailors in radar navigation; this training moved to Fareham in 1959 for sailors, and officer radar training moved to Somerset in July 1960.

The site became the Royal Naval School of Meteorology and Oceanography in 1968.

Hydrography
Hydrography was taught in Devon, and any additional oceanography was taught at Fareham, at the Applied Oceanography and Meteorological Centre.

The site in Cornwall closed in 2003, and meteorological and oceanography training was moved to the RN School of Hydrography, in Devon; this site in Devon opened in the early 1960s. The RN Hydrography School received four survey motor boats in September 1996.

The combined site is now the HMTU.

Commanders
 2000 John Sephton

Meteorology in the Royal Navy
After training, officers entered the Naval Weather Service. The Weather and Oceanographic Centre was in Hertfordshire, which is now the Joint Operational Meteorology Oceanography Centre.

Training
The meteorology course was known as METOC. Current training has six months of meteorology, followed by three months of hydrography.

See also
 List of survey vessels of the Royal Navy
 Naval Hydrographic and Oceanographic Service, of France

References

External links
 Hydrographic and Meteorological Training Unit - HMTU

Education in Cornwall
Meteorological research institutes
Naval meteorology
Oceanographic organizations
Training establishments of the Royal Navy